Tarascon-sur-Ariège is a railway station in Tarascon-sur-Ariège, Occitanie, France. The station is on the Portet-Saint-Simon–Puigcerdà railway. The station is served by TER (local) and Intercités de nuit (night trains) services operated by the SNCF.

Train services
The following services currently call at Tarascon-sur-Ariège:
night service (Intercités de nuit) Paris–Toulouse–Pamiers–Latour-de-Carol
local service (TER Occitanie) Toulouse–Foix–Latour-de-Carol-Enveitg

Bus Services

Bus services depart from Tarascon-sur-Ariège towards Ax-les-Thermes, Luzenac, Les Cabannes (Town Centre), Ussat-les-Bains, Mercus-Garrabet, Saint-Paul-de-Jarrat, Montgaillard, Foix, Saint-Jean-de-Verges, Varilhes and Pamiers.

References

Railway stations in Ariège (department)
Railway stations in France opened in 1877